The 1978 NCAA Division I baseball season, play of college baseball in the United States organized by the National Collegiate Athletic Association (NCAA) began in the spring of 1978.  The season progressed through the regular season and concluded with the 1978 College World Series.  The College World Series, held for the thirty-second time in 1978, consisted of one team from each of eight regional competitions and was held in Omaha, Nebraska at Johnny Rosenblatt Stadium as a double-elimination tournament.  Southern California claimed the championship for the eleventh time.

Conference winners
This is a partial list of conference champions from the 1978 season.  The NCAA sponsored regional competitions to determine the College World Series participants.  Seven regionals of four teams and one of six each competed in double-elimination tournaments, with the winners advancing to Omaha.  21 teams earned automatic bids by winning their conference championship while 13 teams earned at-large selections.

Conference standings
The following is an incomplete list of conference standings:

College World Series

The 1978 season marked the thirty second NCAA Baseball Tournament, which culminated with the eight team College World Series.  The College World Series was held in Omaha, Nebraska.  The eight teams played a double-elimination format, with Southern California claiming their eleventh championship with a 10–3 win over Arizona State in the final.

Award winners

All-America team

References